Lupak Luas, widely known as Kampong Lupak Luas, is a village-level subdivision of Lumapas, a mukim (subdistrict) of Brunei-Muara District, Brunei. The postcode for Kampong Lupak Luas is BJ2524.

Name 
Kampong Lupak Luas comes from the Malay name which translates as 'Lupak Luas Village'.

References 

Lupak Luas